Dorrit's Pleasure Trip is a 1916 German silent film comedy directed by Paul Heidemann.

Cast

References

Bibliography

External links

1916 films
Films of the German Empire
German silent feature films
German black-and-white films
German comedy films
1916 comedy films
Silent comedy films
1910s German films